Mount Perkins is a mountain at the east end of the Fosdick Mountains in the Ford Ranges, Marie Byrd Land. It was discovered by the Byrd Antarctic Expedition on the Northeastern Flight of December 15–16, 1934, and named for Jack E. Perkins, who was a biologist at the United States Antarctic Service (USAS) West Base (1939–41) and the leader of a biological party which visited this area in December 1940.

References

Mountains of Marie Byrd Land